This list contains acronyms and initials related to diseases (infectious or non-infectious) and medical disorders.

A

B

C

D

E

F

G

H

I

J

K

L

M

N

O

P

Q

R

S

T

U

V

W

X

Y

Z

See also
 Acronyms in healthcare
 List of medical abbreviations: Overview
 List of medical abbreviations: Latin abbreviations
 List of abbreviations for medical organisations and personnel
 List of abbreviations used in medical prescriptions
 List of optometric abbreviations

External links
  Centers for Disease Control and Prevention website
  National Institute of Neurological Disorders and Stroke (NINDS)
 Disease Acronyms and Abbreviations
 Genetic and Rare Diseases Information Center (GARD)

 
Health-related lists